Frank Warren may refer to:

 Frank Warren (American football) (1959–2002), played for the New Orleans Saints
 Frank Warren (promoter) (born 1952), English boxing manager and promoter
 Frank Warren (racing driver) (born 1937), retired NASCAR Cup Series driver
 Francis E. Warren (1844–1929), American politician, U.S. senator from Wyoming
 Frank M. Warren Sr. (1848–1912), American businessman and millionaire
 Frank Warren, founder of the PostSecret website project

See also
Frank Warne (1906–1994), Australian cricketer
Fran Warren (1926–2013), American singer